Ivan Ninčević (born 27 November 1981) is a former Croatian handball player. He competed for the Croatian national team at the 2012 Summer Olympics in London, winning the bronze medal.

Honours
Zagreb
Croatian First League (5): 2000-01, 2001–02, 2002–03, 2003–04, 2004–05
Croatian Cup (5): 2001, 2002, 2003, 2004, 2005
EHF Cup Winners' Cup Runner-up (1): 2005

References

External links
 

1981 births
Living people
Sportspeople from Zadar
Croatian male handball players
Olympic handball players of Croatia
Handball players at the 2012 Summer Olympics
Olympic bronze medalists for Croatia
Olympic medalists in handball
Medalists at the 2012 Summer Olympics
RK Zagreb players
Beşiktaş J.K. Handball Team players
Expatriate handball players in Turkey